This is a list of the commemorative stamps of the United Kingdom for the years 2020–2029.

List

2020

2021

2022

Other periods
 United Kingdom commemorative stamps 1924–1969
 United Kingdom commemorative stamps 1970–1979
 United Kingdom commemorative stamps 1980–1989
 United Kingdom commemorative stamps 1990–1999
 United Kingdom commemorative stamps 2000–2009
 United Kingdom commemorative stamps 2010–2019

See also

 Stanley Gibbons
 Stamp collecting
 List of people on stamps
 Philately
 Stamps
 PHQ Cards
The WikiBooks Worldwide Stamp Catalogue

References

External links
 Stanley Gibbons
 Royal Mail
 Collect GB Stamps
 British First Day Covers
 Gibbons Stamp Monthly

2020
Commemorative stamps
Lists of postage stamps
Commemorative
Commemorative stamps